Canthonella gomezi is a species of beetle in family Scarabaeidae. It is endemic to Venezuela, and is restricted to cloud forest habitat in the Cordillera Central.

It is included in the IUCN Red List of Threatened Species and the Venezuelan Red Book of Fauna.

Sources

Deltochilini
Beetles of South America
Beetles described in 1968